Rafael Escuredo Rodríguez (born 16 April 1944) is a Spanish politician and lawyer, member of the Spanish Socialist Workers' Party of Andalusia, who was President of Andalusia between 1979 and 1984.

References

1944 births
Living people
Spanish Socialist Workers' Party politicians
Presidents of the Regional Government of Andalusia